George Nicolau (February 14, 1925 – January 2, 2020) was a labor lawyer and arbitrator, president of National Academy of Arbitrators, and chairman of Major League Baseball’s arbitration panel. He was also an arbitrator for the National Basketball Association and many other organizations in aviation, communications, sports, and entertainment.

Nicolau is best known for his decisions in the Major League Baseball collusion cases known as Collusion II and Collusion III, which resulted in a $280m settlement.

Nicolau's papers are deposited at the Tamiment Library and Robert F. Wagner Labor Archives at New York University.

A native of Detroit, Michigan, Nicolau died in New York City on January 2, 2020.

Notes

External links
 Professional profile at the National Mediation Board

Major League Baseball labor relations
Arbitrators
American labor lawyers
1925 births
2020 deaths
Columbia Law School alumni
University of Michigan alumni
American people of Greek descent
20th-century American lawyers
Lawyers from Detroit